Anaktorio (Greek: Ανακτόριο) is a former municipality in Aetolia-Acarnania, West Greece, Greece. Since the 2011 local government reform it is part of the municipality Aktio-Vonitsa, of which it is a municipal unit. The municipal unit has an area of 214.112 km2. The municipal unit is mainly flat and has a total population of 9,129 residents according to the 2011 census, roughly half of which are found in the town of Vonitsa.

Subdivisions
The municipal unit Anaktorio is subdivided into the following communities (constituent villages in brackets):
Vonitsa (Vonitsa, Aktio, Nea Kamarina)
Agios Nikolaos Vonitsis
Drymos (Drymos, Petra)
Thyrio (Thyrio, Gourgouvli)
Monastiraki (Monastiraki, Korpi)
Paliampela

References

External links
 Municipality of Anaktorio 

Populated places in Aetolia-Acarnania
Cities in ancient Greece